Rondee Smith (born 7 August 1991) is a Jamaican international footballer who plays for Portmore United, as a striker.

References

1991 births
Living people
Jamaican footballers
Jamaica international footballers
Portmore United F.C. players
Association football forwards
National Premier League players